Dimethyl terephthalate (DMT) is an organic compound with the formula C6H4(COOCH3)2. It is the diester formed from terephthalic acid and methanol.  It is a white solid that melts to give a distillable colourless liquid.

Production
Dimethyl terephthalate (DMT) has been produced in a number of ways. Conventionally, and still of commercial value, is the direct esterification of terephthalic acid. Alternatively, it can be prepared by alternating oxidation and methyl-esterification steps from p-xylene via methyl p-toluate (PT).

Dimethyl terephthalate by the Witten process
The method for the production of DMT from p-xylene (PX) and methanol consists of a multistep process involving both oxidation and esterification. A mixture of p-xylene (PX) and methyl p-toluate is oxidized with air in the presence of cobalt and manganese catalysts. The acid mixture resulting from the oxidation is esterified with methanol to produce a mixture of esters. The crude ester mixture is then distilled to remove all the heavy boilers and residue that are produced; lighter esters such as monomethyl terephthalate are recycled to the oxidation section.  The raw DMT is then sent to the crystallization section to remove DMT isomers, residual acids and aromatic aldehydes.

Oxidation of methyl p-toluate followed by esterification also yields dimethyl terephthalate (DMT) as shown in the below reaction:

Dimethyl terephthalate by direct esterification
DMT can also be made by a different route, namely direct esterification of terephthalic acid with methanol.  The dimethyl terephthalate that is formed is then purified by distillation.  Even terephthalic acid of low purity may be used in this method.
C8H6O4 + 2CH3OH → C10H10O4 + 2 H2O
in the presence of o-xylene at 250–300 °C.

Uses
DMT is used in the production of polyesters, including polyethylene terephthalate (PET), polytrimethylene terephthalate (PTT), and polybutylene terephthalate (PBT).  Structurally, DMT consists of a benzene ring substituted at the 1 and 4 positions with methyl carboxylate (-CO2CH3) groups.  Because DMT is volatile, it is an intermediate in some schemes for the recycling of PET, e.g. from plastic bottles.

Hydrogenation of DMT affords the diol cyclohexanedimethanol, which is a useful monomer.

References

External links
 Supplier:Teijin Limited   https://web.archive.org/web/20150503041344/http://www.teijin.com/products/chemicals/dmt/
 http://www.inchem.org/documents/icsc/icsc/eics0262.htm
 
U.S. National Library of Medicine: Hazardous Substances Databank – Dimethyl+terephthalate

Methyl esters
Terephthalate esters
Commodity chemicals